Slavgorodskoye is a rural locality (a selo) in Alexeyevsky District, Belgorod Oblast, Russia. The population was 276 as of 2010. There are 8 streets.

Geography 
Slavgorodskoye is located 32 km southeast of Alexeyevka (the district's administrative centre) by road. Kopanets is the nearest rural locality.

References 

Rural localities in Alexeyevsky District, Belgorod Oblast
Biryuchensky Uyezd